Aleksei Anatolyevich Vereshchak (born 2 December 1976) is a former Russian professional footballer.

Honours
 Russian Second Division Zone Povolzhye top scorer: 1999 (27 goals).

External links
 

1976 births
Sportspeople from Tolyatti
Living people
Russian footballers
Association football midfielders
Russian Premier League players
Russian expatriate footballers
Expatriate footballers in Kazakhstan
FC Lada-Tolyatti players
FC Shinnik Yaroslavl players
FC Tom Tomsk players
FC Dynamo Barnaul players
FC Kyzylzhar players
Russian expatriate sportspeople in Kazakhstan
FC Orenburg players
FC Dynamo Saint Petersburg players
FC Novokuznetsk players